(born 28 September 1966 in Yamanashi, Japan) is a former rugby union footballer who played for Japan. 
Playing at flanker, Kajihara played 21 Tests for Japan between 1989 and 1997. He scored 19 points from his four tries. Kajihara played in both the 1991 and 1995 Rugby World Cups for Japan. He played three games in each World Cup including matches against Scotland, Ireland and the All Blacks.

Coaching career
He coached the Katsura High School and then, the Hikawa High School, both teams from his hometown, Yamanashi.

References

1966 births
Living people
Japanese rugby union coaches
Japanese rugby union players
Rugby union flankers
Japan international rugby union players
Toshiba Brave Lupus Tokyo players
Japan international rugby sevens players